All-Russian Scientific Research And Design Institute Of Energy Technology (VNIPIET) is a research institute in Saint Petersburg, Russia.

VNIPIET prepares designs and project documentation for the construction, reconstruction, and technical refurbishment of atomic power stations. It is associated with many major projects in this field, including design of the containment sarcophagus for the damaged reactor at Chernobyl. It also does design work for radiochemical, metallurgical, mechanical, and instrument-engineering plants and performs research work on decontamination and removal of radioactive contamination and transportation of radioactive waste.

References

External links
 Official website

Manufacturing companies of Russia
Companies based in Saint Petersburg
Ministry of Medium Machine Building
Research institutes in the Soviet Union
Research institutes established in 1933
Nuclear technology in the Soviet Union
1933 establishments in the Soviet Union